The Mesa Historical Museum is a historical museum in Mesa, Arizona, United States. It was opened in 1987 by the Mesa Historical Society to preserve the history of Mesa, Arizona.

The museum's exhibits include a comprehensive history of Mesa, a replica of an early adobe one-room schoolhouse, as well as additional galleries of changing exhibits. The museum also maintains a large collection of historic agricultural equipment.

The museum buildings are in fact the museum's largest artifacts.  The main museum building was built in 1913-1914 for use as the Lehi School in what was then Lehi, Arizona.  The auditorium was built in the 1930s as a Works Progress Administration project.  The two-building complex was added to the National Register of Historic Places in 2001 as the "Lehi School".

In 2008, the museum began developing a popular exhibit about Spring Training (baseball) in Arizona, called "Play Ball: The Cactus League Experience." The exhibition has since expanded to locations throughout Maricopa County.

References

External links

 Mesa Historical Museum – official site
 Play Ball: The Cactus League Experience

Agriculture museums in the United States
American West museums in Arizona
City museums in the United States
Culture of Mesa, Arizona
History museums in Arizona
Museums in Mesa, Arizona
Museums established in 1987
Works Progress Administration in Arizona
National Register of Historic Places in Maricopa County, Arizona
Buildings and structures completed in 1913